Mary Stallcup (June 21, 1954 – May 17, 1997) was a lawyer who served as Attorney General of Arkansas from December 1990 to January 1991. She was the first woman to hold the office. She was a Democrat. She was appointed by Arkansas governor Bill Clinton and succeeded Ron Field after his resignation. She was succeeded by Winston Bryant, who won election to the office, January 15, 1991. She was born in Omaha, Nebraska.

See also
Leslie Rutledge, the second woman to serve as Attorney General of Arkansas and the first elected to the office

References

External links
Findagrave entry

1954 births
1997 deaths
Lawyers from Omaha, Nebraska
Arkansas Democrats